Tisséo is the brand adopted in 2002 for the transport network of Toulouse, under the authority of the Syndicat mixte des transports en commun (SMTC).

Tisséo operates two metro lines, two tramway lines, a hundred buses, and shuttle services (bus, mobibus, TAD), with a unified magnetic ticketing and RFID card system.

The position and live schedules of all buses, subway trains, and trams are available on the website and Tisséo app.

Subway 
Opened in 1993, the Tisséo metro has two lines, fully automated.

Subway access requires a magnetic ticket or an RFID card, usable both on metro networks, bus, tramway and TAD (on-demand bus).

See also 
 List of Toulouse metro stations
 Toulouse tramway

References

External links 
  Tisséo Official Website

Railway companies of France
Rapid transit in France
Transport in Toulouse